The 1994 Brown Bears football team was an American football team that represented Brown University during the 1994 NCAA Division I-AA football season. Brown tied for second in the Ivy League. 

In their first season under head coach Mark Whipple, the Bears compiled a 7–3 record and outscored opponents 229 to 197. B. Atkins and Charlie Buckley were the team captains. 

The Bears 4–3 conference tied for second in the Ivy League standings. They outscored Ivy opponents 151 to 143. 

Brown played its home games at Brown Stadium in Providence, Rhode Island.

Schedule

References

Brown
Brown Bears football seasons
Brown Bears football